Daughters of Destiny may refer to:
 Daughters of Destiny (film), a 1954 Franco-Italian co-production comedy drama film
 Daughters of Destiny (novel), a 1906 novel by L. Frank Baum
 Daughters of Destiny (TV series), a 2017 English-language Netflix documentary series

See also
 Daughter of Destiny (disambiguation)